Pseudopontixanthobacter sediminis is a Gram-negative, non-spore-forming and non-motile bacterium from the genus of Pseudopontixanthobacter which has been isolated from lagoon sediments from the coast of Korea.

References

External links
Type strain of Altererythrobacter sediminis at BacDive -  the Bacterial Diversity Metadatabase

Sphingomonadales
Bacteria described in 2016